Amir Hossein Feshangchi (born 7 January 1987 in Tehran, Iran) is an Iranian football midfielder.

Club career

Persepolis
He joined Persepolis in summer 1999 as a youth player. He started his professional career with Saba in 2005. He played five seasons for Saba and moved to Persepolis in the summer of 2010 and was used as left winger, and left back. In 2012, he extended his contract with Persepolis for three years, keeping him in the team till 2015.

Malavan
He transferred to Malavan in the summer of 2013. In his first and only season with Malavan, Feshangchi made 27 appearances and led the league in assists with 11, helping Malavan to a high table finish.

Paykan
Feshanghchi signed a two-year contract with Paykan on 10 June 2014. He made his debut in a match against Sepahan, where Paykan lost the match 2–0.

Club career statistics

 Assist Goals

International career
In 2009, Feshangchi made his debut for Iran in a friendly match against Iceland.

Honours
Persepolis
Hazfi Cup: 2010–11; Runner-up 2012–13

Individual
Iran Pro League top goal assistant: 2013–14

References

External links 
 Amir Hossein Feshangchi at PersianLeague.com
 Amir Hossein Feshangchi's Profile in 18ghadam.ir
 

1987 births
Living people
Iranian footballers
Iran international footballers
Saba players
Persian Gulf Pro League players
Azadegan League players
Association football defenders
Persepolis F.C. players
Havadar S.C. players